Hotel du Vin is a luxury boutique hotel chain that has nineteen hotels throughout the United Kingdom, co-founded by Gerard Basset and Robin Hutson.

History
The hotel chain was founded in Winchester in 1994 by Gerard Basset and Robin Hutson, who had both previously worked at Chewton Glen hotel where Basset was the head sommelier and Hutson the managing director.  The name "Hotel du Vin" was a reference to Basset's wine expertise.  At the time Basset was a Master Sommelier; he went on to become a Master of Wine (1998).

KSL Capital Partners purchased the Hotel du Vin chain and the Malmaison hotel chain early in 2013, before selling both hotel brands to Frasers Hospitality for £363m in 2015.

Locations
Subsequent hotels were established in other locations including Birmingham, Brighton, Bristol Avon Gorge, Bristol City Centre, Cambridge, Cheltenham, Edinburgh, Exeter, Glasgow, Harrogate, Henley-on-Thames, Newcastle, Poole, St Andrews, Stratford Upon Avon, Tunbridge Wells, Wimbledon, Winchester and York. As of 2019, Hotel du Vin were operating nineteen hotels across the UK, primarily in university locations and cathedral cities.

Plans have been submitted to convert Pearl Assurance House into a 70 bedroom site in Manchester which will also feature a rooftop bar.

References

External links
Hotel du Vin official website

Hotel chains in the United Kingdom